Auer is a comune (municipality) in South Tyrol in northern Italy, located about  south of the city of Bolzano.

Geography

Auer borders the following municipalities: Aldein, Bronzolo, Montan and Vadena.

History

Coat-of-arms
The shield is party per fess of argent and gules with an azure chief with a rampant lion. It is the emblem of the family Khuen who took possession of the site, from 1397 until 1690, when they were then elevated to the Imperial Counts. On the azure chief two crossed or keys are represented as a remembrance of the insignia of St. Peter, to whom the parish church is dedicated. The emblem was adopted in 1969.

Society

Linguistic distribution
According to the 2011 census, 69.74% of the population speak German, 29.59% Italian and 0.67% Ladin as first language.

Demographic evolution

References

External links

  Homepage of the municipality

Municipalities of South Tyrol
Articles which contain graphical timelines